In baseball, a hitting streak is the number of consecutive official games in which a player appears and gets at least one base hit. According to the Official Baseball Rules, such a streak is not necessarily ended when a player has at least 1 plate appearance and no hits. A streak shall not be terminated if all official plate appearances result in a base on balls, hit by pitch, defensive interference or a sacrifice bunt. The streak shall terminate if the player has a sacrifice fly and no hit.

Joe DiMaggio holds the Major League Baseball record with a streak of 56 consecutive games in 1941 which began on May 15 and ended July 17. DiMaggio hit .408 during his streak (91-for-223), with 15 home runs and 55 runs batted in.

Major League Baseball records

There have been 55 occurrences in Major League Baseball where a player had a hitting streak of at least 30 games. Multiple streaks in the same season have occurred in 1922 (George Sisler and Rogers Hornsby), 1987 (Paul Molitor and Benito Santiago), 1997 (Nomar Garciaparra and Sandy Alomar Jr.), 1999 (Vladimir Guerrero and Luis Gonzalez), 2006 (Chase Utley and Willy Taveras), and 2011 (Andre Ethier and Dan Uggla). In addition, 1924 included one whole streak (Sam Rice) and the beginning of another (George Sisler). A similar event occurred in 2006 with two whole streaks (Utley and Taveras) and the end of another (Jimmy Rollins).

Keeler's streak started in his final game of the 1896 season, and continued through the first 44 games of the 1897 season. Rollins ended the 2005 season with a 36-game streak and extended it through the first two games of the 2006 season. Sisler had a hit in the last game of 1924 and the first 34 games of 1925.  Major League Baseball recognizes two hitting streak records: Longest hitting streak in one season, and longest hitting streak over multiple seasons (e.g. Rollins 2005–2006). Keeler's, Sisler's, and Rollins' streaks are listed as 44, 34, and 36 games when discussing single-season streaks, and 45, 35, and 38 games when discussing multiple-season streaks.

This list omits Denny Lyons of the 1887 American Association Philadelphia Athletics, who had a 52-game hitting streak. In 1887, the major leagues adopted a new rule which counted walks as hits, a rule which was dropped after that season. Lyons hit in 52 consecutive games that season, but his streak included two games (#22 and #44) in which his only "hits" were walks. In 1968, MLB ruled that walks in 1887 would not be counted as hits, so Lyons' streak was no longer recognized, though it still appears on some lists. In 2000 Major League Baseball reversed its 1968 decision, ruling that the statistics which were recognized in each year's official records should stand, even in cases where they were later proven incorrect. Paradoxically, the ruling affects only hit totals for the year; the batting champion for the year is not recognized as the all-time leader despite having the highest single-season average under the ruling, and Lyons' hitting streak is not recognized.

Ty Cobb, Sam Rice, and George Sisler are the only players with multiple streaks of 30 games or longer.

There have been 129 single-season streaks of 25 games or more. The lowest batting average ever recorded during a hitting streak of 25 games or more was .304 by Bruce Campbell in 1938. The highest was .486 during Chuck Klein's streak in 1930. Joe DiMaggio hit .408 during his record-holding 56-game streak. In probability theory, every baseball game is a Bernoulli trial in which a hitter either does or does not get a hit.  DiMaggio's streak of 56 consecutive games with hits awaits an equal streak: "The probability is .0003 that a .350 hitter will have a hitting streak of at least 56 games in a season. If there are about 4 such seasons per year in the future, we would expect to see such a streak, assuming the Bernoulli trials model, every 1/(.0003 x 4) = 833 years."

Major League Baseball records by franchise
Only currently extant franchises are included on this list.  Where a player had a significant streak while the team was in other than its current city, the records in these other cities are displayed.  As above, for a multi-year streak, the single-season streak is shown in parentheses.

Minor League Baseball records
The longest streaks in the history of Minor League Baseball and other professional baseball leagues:

DiMaggio set the Minor League record as a member of the San Francisco Seals.  Unrecognized by Minor League Baseball is the 69 game hitting streak by Joe Wilhoit in 1919.  Wilhoit was in the independent Western League at the time and his record is considered the all-time Professional Baseball record.

College Baseball records

College Softball records

See also

 Batting (baseball)

References

External links
 Major League Baseball hitting streaks at mlb.com

Baseball accomplishments
Baseball terminology